Daniil Medvedev was the defending champion, but chose not to participate this year.

Hubert Hurkacz won his first ATP Tour title, defeating Benoît Paire in the final, 6–3, 3–6, 6–3. Hurkacz became the first Polish man to win a Tour-level singles title since Wojtek Fibak in 1982.

Lee Duck-hee become the first deaf player to win a main draw match on the ATP Tour when he defeated Henri Laaksonen in the first round.

Seeds
All seeds receive a bye into the second round.

Draw

Finals

Top half

Section 1

Section 2

Bottom half

Section 3

Section 4

Qualifying

Seeds

Qualifiers

Qualifying draw

First qualifier

Second qualifier

Third qualifier

Fourth qualifier

References

External links
Main draw
Qualifying draw

2019 ATP Tour
2019 Singles